Colin James Ness Wilson (born 19 July 1956) FRS  FRSNZ is Professor of Volcanology at Victoria University of Wellington in New Zealand.

Education
Wilson was educated at Imperial College London where he was awarded a Bachelor of Science degree in Geology in 1977 followed by a PhD in 1981 for research on pyroclastic flows.

Awards and honours
Wilson was elected a Fellow of the Royal Society (FRS) in 2015. His certificate of election reads:

In 2017 he was awarded the Rutherford Medal of the Royal Society of New Zealand for his research on how large volcanoes behave before and during explosive eruptions, including those that created Lake Taupo.

References

1956 births
Living people
Fellows of the Royal Society
Fellows of the Royal Society of New Zealand
Fellows of the American Geophysical Union
Academic staff of the Victoria University of Wellington
Place of birth missing (living people)
British volcanologists
Recipients of the Rutherford Medal
People from Wantage